Oqqoʻrgʻon is a city in Tashkent Region, Uzbekistan. It is the administrative center of Oqqoʻrgʻon District. Its population is 11,900 (2016).

Its inhabitants are mostly Uzbeks, as well as Russians, Kazakhs, Tajiks, Koreans, Tatars and other nationalities.

References

Populated places in Tashkent Region
Cities in Uzbekistan